The booted racket-tails are a small group of hummingbirds in the genus Ocreatus that was long considered to have only one species, O. underwoodii.

Taxonomy
The genus was first recognized by John Gould in 1846. Field research by Karl-L. Schuchmann published in 2016, however, found notable differences between some populations traditionally assigned to O. underwoodii,  and recommended that the taxa annae, addae, and peruanus be raised to species level. The research results have been mostly accepted by the International Ornithological Union, with more data required for the species status of Anna's racket-tail. The American Ornithological Society has yet to recognize the split.

Species
The genus contains three species:

References

 booted racket-tail
Birds of the Peruvian Andes
Birds of the Bolivian Andes